Hajee Mohammad Danesh Science and Technology University (HSTU) ) is a government-financed public university of Bangladesh. Locally it is known as Hajee Danesh University.

About Hajee Mohammad Danesh
Hajee Mohammad Danesh (19001986) was leading political activist of South Asia during British colonialism. He was born in Sultanpur village in Dinajpur District. He obtained his M.A. in history from Aligarh Muslim University in 1931 and B.L. degree in 1932.
In the 1930s, Danesh became active in the communist organisations of Bengal, especially the Bengal provincial organisation of the Communist Party of India. He was arrested twice in 1938 by the government of Bengal for his participation in the Tebhaga movement, an agitation in northern Bengal against zamindars landlords for landless peasants and sharecroppers who sought a greater share of the yield, most of which was surrendered to the zamindars. Danesh was one of the few Muslim communist leaders of the struggle, and worked to mobilise the Muslim peasantry in favour of the movement. In 1945, he joined the All India Muslim League, but was later expelled for his participation in the continuing Tebagha movement, and re-arrested by the Bengal government in 1946. After the partition of India and Bengal in 1947, Danesh remained in his home district of Dinajpur, which fell in Muslim-majority East Bengal, which became part of the newly created Muslim state of Pakistan.
He died in Dhaka on 28 June 1986.

History

Shortly after the death in May 2009 of M. A. Wazed Miah, a physicist and the husband of Prime Minister Sheikh Hasina, the regents of the university announced that the campus's third academic building, to be built later that year, would be named in his honour.

On 16 April 2015, two students were killed during clashes between factions of the Bangladesh Chhatra League, the student front of the ruling Awami League party. Two arrests were made in the case five years later.

Vice-Chancellor M. Abul Kashem was the target of a number of protests during his tenure. On 5 November 2018, students staged a sit-in over his handling of multiple sexual harassment complaints against two teachers. Sixteen teachers went on strike in October 2020 alleging that Kashem had been out of his office and unreachable for seven months, leading to administrative paralysis. Kashem, whose term was due to expire at the end of January 2021, fled campus two weeks early after jobseekers, who had besieged his official residence and cut off power and water to it, stormed the building and held him and his wife captive for six hours.

List of vice-chancellors 
 Prof. Md. Kamruzzaman ( present )

Campus

Library

The university Library contains a collection of more than 25,000 volumes, including bound volumes of periodicals. It subscribes to over 50 foreign journals. A complete automation of the system is in the process. The Confined Section of the library contains rare books.

Medical centre
The medical centre offers free medical service to students, teachers, staff and family members of the teachers and staff. The centre provides service round-the-clock, seven-days-a-week, with four doctors with ambulance facility. The centre has 12 bed accommodation so that patients with contagious diseases may be cared for in isolation.

Halls of residence

Male halls 
 Sheikh Russel Hall
 Shaheed President Ziaur Rahman Hall
 Tajuddin Ahmed Hall
 Bangabandhu Sheikh Mujibur Rahman Hall
 International Hall

Female halls 
 Sheikh Fajilatunnesa Mujib Hall
Ivy Rahman Hall
Kobi Sufia Kamal Hall
An extended area for foreign students.

Faculties

There are 9 faculties in HSTU with 45 departments:
 Faculty of Postgraduate
 Faculty of Agriculture
 Department of Agronomy (AGN)
 Department of Horticulture (HRT)
 Department of Soil Science (SC)
 Department of Entomology (ENT)
 Department of Plant Pathology (PLP)
 Department of Genetics and Plant Breeding (GPB)
 Department of Crop Physiology and Ecology (CPE)
 Department of Agricultural Extension (AEX)
 Department of Agricultural Chemistry (ACH)
 Department of Agroforestry and Environment (AGF)
 Department of Biochemistry and Molecular Biology (BMB)
 Faculty of Computer Science and Engineering
 Department of Computer Science and Engineering (CSE)
 Department of Electronics and  Communication Engineering (ECE)
 Department of Electrical and Electronic Engineering (EEE)
 Faculty of Business Studies:
 Department of Accounting (ACT)
 Department of Management Studies (MGT)
 Department of Marketing (MKT)
 Department of Finance and Banking (FIB)
 Faculty of Fisheries
 Department of Fisheries Biology and Genetics (FBG)
 Department of Fisheries Management (FMG)
 Department of Fisheries Technology (FTL)
 Department of Aquaculture (AQC)
 Faculty of Veterinary & Animal Science
 Department of Microbiology (MIC)
 Department of Pathology and Parasitology (PPS)
 Department of Dairy and Poultry Science (DPS)
 Department of Anatomy and Histology (ANH)
 Department of General Animal Science and Nutrition (GASN)
 Department of Genetics and Animal Breeding (GAB)
 Department of Medicine, Surgery and Obstetrics (MSO)
 Department of Physiology and Pharmacology (PPH)
 Faculty of Engineering
 Department of Agricultural and Industrial Engineering (AIE)
 Department of Food Processing and Preservation (FPP)
 Department of Food Engineering and Technology (FET)
 Department of Food Science and Nutrition (FSN)
 Department of Architecture (ARCH)
 Department of Civil Engineering (CE)
 Department of Mechanical Engineering (ME)
 Faculty of Science:
 Department of Chemistry (CHE)
 Department of Statistics (STAT)
 Department of Mathematics (MAT)
 Department of Physics (PHY)
 Faculty of Social Science & Arts
 Department of English (ENG)
 Department of Economics (ECN)
 Department of Sociology (SOC)
 Department of Development Studies (DS)

Academics

Degrees offered
The university offers 23 undergraduate degrees under 9 faculties along with several postgraduate and doctoral courses.

Undergraduate degree programs 

There are 1525 seats available for undergraduate admission.

Postgraduate degree programs 
 Faculty of Postgraduate Studies:
 PhD
 MA
 MS
 MBA
 Evening MBA

Research
Three years of research under Md. Hasanuzzaman, Chairman of the Genetics and Plant Breeding Department, led in 2014 to two new varieties of sweet pumpkins. The varieties, named "Hajee" and "Danesh", are higher yielding, sweeter, and have less fiber than other varieties grown in Bangladesh.

Student life

Sports
The university organises sports and other extracurricular and recreational activities. It provides intramural and extramural programmes.
Sports Club
HSTU FC(Football club)
HSTU Cricket Club
HSTU Blade Skating
The directorate organizes and conducts interdepartmental and inter-hall tournaments, individual hall athletics, university athletics, and inter-university games and sports. Students participate in national championships in games and sports for which training and coaching are offered.

Ragging
HSTU has implemented policies to address the issue of ragging, however, the effectiveness of these policies in preventing incidents of ragging is questionable. The university has established anti-ragging committees at all levels and a hotline number for students to report incidents, however, the actual enforcement of these policies may be lacking. This has resulted in a continuation of ragging within the university, indicating that the university's efforts to prevent ragging may not be fully effective.

See also
Military Institute of Science and Technology (MIST)

References

External links

 Official Website
 HSTU Students Affaaris & Advisory Division (SAAD-HSTU)

Public universities of Bangladesh
Educational institutions established in 2002
2002 establishments in Bangladesh
Universities of science and technology in Bangladesh
Organisations based in Dinajpur